Xiang Xingyao (1924 – 28 October 1997) was a Chinese translator and associate professor at Fujian Normal University. He was one of the main translators of the works of the Russian writer Alexander Herzen into Chinese. Some of his English translations were published by People's Literature Publishing House.

Biography
Xiang was born in Suzhou, Jiangsu, in 1924. After the establishment of the Communist State, he taught at East China Normal University in Shanghai.

In October 1969, he was sent to the May Seventh Cadre Schools to do farm works in Xinan Commune of Xiapu County, Fujian Province. After the Cultural Revolution, he taught at Fujian Normal University.

He died of intestinal cancer on October 28, 1997.

Personal life
Xiang married Xing Guifen, who was an actress at Fanghua Yue Opera Troupe.

Translations
 My Past and Thoughts
 Middlemarch
 The Portrait of a Lady
 Mansfield Park

References

1924 births
1997 deaths
Academic staff of the East China Normal University
Academic staff of Fujian Normal University
Writers from Suzhou
English–Chinese translators
Russian–Chinese translators
People's Republic of China translators
Educators from Suzhou
20th-century Chinese translators